The Venezuelan migration and refugee crisis, the largest recorded refugee crisis in the Americas, refers to the emigration of millions of Venezuelans from their native country during the presidencies of Hugo Chávez and Nicolás Maduro because of the Bolivarian Revolution. The revolution was an attempt by Chávez and later Maduro to establish a cultural and political hegemony, which culminated in the crisis in Bolivarian Venezuela. The resulting refugee crisis has been compared to those faced by Cuban exiles, Syrian refugees and those affected by the European migrant crisis. The Bolivarian government has denied any migratory crisis, stating that the United Nations and others are attempting to justify foreign intervention within Venezuela.

Newsweek described the "Bolivarian diaspora" as "a reversal of fortune on a massive scale", where the "reversal" is a comparison with Venezuela's high immigration rate during the 20th century. Initially, upper class Venezuelans and scholars emigrated during Chávez's presidency, but middle- and lower-class Venezuelans began to leave as conditions worsened in the country. It has caused a brain drain that affected the nation, due to the large number of emigrants who are educated or skilled. After disappointment with opposition politics in the country, Venezuelans opposed to President Maduro also left the country, resulting with increased support for the Maduro government. During the crisis, Venezuelans have often been asked about their desire to leave their native country, and over 30 percent of those asked in a December 2015 survey said that they planned to permanently leave Venezuela. The percentage nearly doubled the following September as, according to Datincorp, 57 percent of respondents wanted to leave the country. By mid-2019, over four million Venezuelans, around 13 percent of the country's population, had emigrated since the revolution began in 1999.

The United Nations predicted that by the end of 2019, there would have been over 5 million recorded emigrants during the Venezuelan crisis, over 15% of the population. A late-2018 study by the Brookings Institution suggested that emigration would reach 6 million – approximately 20% of Venezuela's 2017 population – by the end of 2019, with a mid-2019 poll by Consultares 21 estimating that up to 6 million Venezuelans had fled the country by this point; estimates going into 2020 suggested that the number of Venezuelan migrants and refugees was overtaking the 6 million figure, at this time the same number of refugees from the Syrian Civil War, which started years before the recorded Venezuelan crisis and was considered the worst humanitarian disaster in the world at the time. Estimates had risen to 7.1 million by October 2022.

The Brookings Institution and David Smolansky, Organization of American States commissioner for the Venezuelan refugee crisis, have estimated that the crisis is also the current most underfunded refugee crisis in modern history.

History 
During the 20th century, "Venezuela was a haven for immigrants fleeing Old World repression and intolerance" according to Newsweek. Emigration began at low rates in 1983 after oil prices collapsed, though the increased rates of emigration, especially the flight of professionals, grew largely following the Bolivarian Revolution which was led by Venezuelan president Hugo Chávez. Andrés Bello Catholic University Economic and Social Research Institute head Anitza Freitez said that emigration became more prominent during Chávez's presidency, attributing "individual development prospects and individual security" as the main reasons.

Initial emigration 

In 1998, when Chávez was first elected, the number of Venezuelans granted asylum in the United States increased between 1998 and 1999. Chávez's promise to allocate more funds to the impoverished caused concern among wealthy and middle-class Venezuelans, triggering the first wave of emigrants fleeing the Bolivarian government.

Additional waves of emigration occurred following the 2002 Venezuelan coup d'état attempt and after the Chávez's re-election in 2006. In 2009, it was estimated that more than one million Venezuelans had emigrated in the ten years since Hugo Chávez became president. According to the Central University of Venezuela (UCV), an estimated 1.5 million Venezuelans (four to six percent of the country's total population) emigrated between 1999 and 2014.

Crisis in Venezuela 

Academics and business leaders have said that emigration from Venezuela increased significantly during the final years of Chávez's presidency and during the presidency of Nicolás Maduro. Over time, emigration increased dramatically during the crisis and began to include lower-income Venezuelans, the people whom Chávez promised to aid and who were experiencing hunger in the country's economic crisis. Venezuelan men initially left their wives, children and elderly relatives behind as they fled the country to find work in order to send money back home. Mothers and children would later leave Venezuela to find their families as they grew exacerbated with the crisis as remittances could not sustain their daily needs.

Election of Maduro and 2014 protests 
After the election of Maduro in 2013 and as protests intensified in 2014, the emigration rate from Venezuela grew. The Associated Press reported that the Venezuelan middle-class began to emigrate at this time as the crisis intensified with more shortages, inflation and unrest.

Between 2012 and 2015, the number of Venezuelans who emigrated increased by 2,889 percent. In 2015, PGA Group estimated that a total of about 1.8 million Venezuelans had emigrated. The following year, an estimated 150,000-plus Venezuelans emigrated; scholars studying the diaspora, which The New York Times referred to as an "exodus", reportedly said that this was "the highest [number] in more than a decade".

2017 constitutional crisis and Constituent Assembly elections 
During the 2017 Venezuelan constitutional crisis, Colombia prepared for an increase of Venezuelan refugees. According to the Colombian government, more than 100,000 Venezuelans emigrated to Colombia in the first half of 2017. In the run-up to the 2017 Venezuelan Constituent Assembly elections, Colombia granted a Special Permit of Permanent Residence to Venezuelan citizens who entered the country before July 25; over 22,000 Venezuelans applied for permanent residency in Colombia in the program's first 24 hours. The United Nations High Commissioner for Refugees found that host countries throughout Latin America recorded more than one million Venezuelans settling between 2014 and 2017. The intergovernmental International Organization for Migration (IOM) had similar figures, with about one million Venezuelans emigrating between 2015 and 2017 in their data; other statistics indicated that the IOM's numbers may have been conservative.

2018 re-election of Maduro 
After President Maduro's controversial re-election in May 2018, emigration continued; Venezuelans believed that Maduro's policies would not change, and conditions in the country would continue to deteriorate. In September 2018, the United Nations High Commissioner for Refugees' regional representative officially compared the crisis with the migrant and refugee crisis caused by the Syrian Civil War. The UNHCR and IOM released data in November 2018 showing that the number of refugees fleeing Venezuela since the Bolivarian revolution began in 1999 had risen to 3 million, around 10 percent of the country's population.

Presidential crisis 
Into 2019, president of the Venezuelan National Assembly Juan Guaidó declared himself acting president of Venezuela, beginning a presidential crisis. On April 30, 2019, Guaidó attempted to lead a military uprising to remove Maduro from power, with the plan ultimately failing. Emigration increased once more as Venezuelans predicted that they would not see significant changes and due to the blunders by the opposition. As prospects of political change diminished in Venezuela, a July 2019 poll by Venezuelan-pollster Consultares 21 estimated that between 4.7 and 6 million Venezuelans had left the country. By this point, the Venezuelan refugee crisis was considered the second-worst in the world, behind that from the Syrian Civil War. At the end of 2019, President Maduro had firmly established himself in power and opposition to him had become discouraged, resulting with critics leaving the country while Maduro enjoyed more support from Venezuelans who remained.

Causes 

El Universal reported that according to the UCV study Venezuelan Community Abroad: A New Method of Exile, by Tomás Páez, Mercedes Vivas and Juan Rafael Pulido, the Bolivarian diaspora has been caused by the "deterioration of both the economy and the social fabric, rampant crime, uncertainty and lack of hope for a change of leadership in the near future". The Wall Street Journal said that many "white-collar Venezuelans have fled the country's high crime rates, soaring inflation and expanding statist controls". Studies of current and former citizens of Venezuela indicated that reasons for leaving the country included lack of freedom, high levels of insecurity and lack of opportunity. Link Consultants director Óscar Hernández said that causes for emigration include economic issues, although insecurity and legal uncertainties are the main reasons.

Crime and insecurity 

Venezuela's crime rate is a major cause of emigration. According to sociologist Tomás Páez, Venezuelan parents and grandparents encourage young people to leave the country for their own safety.

Venezuela deteriorated under Hugo Chávez, with political instability and violence increasing. According to Gareth A. Jones and Dennis Rodgers in their book, Youth violence in Latin America: Gangs and Juvenile Justice in Perspective, the change of regime that came with Chávez's presidency caused political conflict, which was "marked by a further increase in the number and rate of violent deaths". Roberto Briceño-León agrees, writing that the Bolivarian Revolution attempted to "destroy what previously existed, the status quo of society", with instability increasing as a result; he also believes that the government furthered these social issues by attributing violence and crime to poverty and inequality, and boasting about reducing both as the Venezuelan murder rate increased. The increase in the murder rate following the Chávez presidency has been attributed by experts to the corruption of Venezuelan authorities, poor gun control, and a poor judicial system. The murder rate increased from 25 per 100,000 in 1999 (when Chávez was elected) to 82 per 100,000 in 2014.

In 2018, there were an estimated 81.4 deaths per 100,000 people, which makes this the highest rate in Latin America. Based on WHO standards, this makes violence an epidemic in 88% of the municipalities. There are also estimates that claims that Venezuela has the highest rates of kidnapping in the region and claims that kidnappings increased over twenty-fold from the beginning of the Chávez presidency to 2011. There has also been a rise in extrajudicial executions in which the government force called Special Action Forces (FAES) carried out executions under the guise of security operations. More than 7,500 of the 23,000 violent deaths reported in 2018 were caused by resistance to authority. Between January and May 2019 there were 2,100 of such deaths reported.

The murder rate in Venezuela had also decreased significantly between 2017 and 2020. In 2018, Venezuela's murder rate–described as the highest in the world–had begun to decrease to 81.4 per 100,000 people according to the Venezuelan Violence Observatory (OVV), with the organization stating that this downward trend was due to the millions of Venezuelans that emigrated from the country at the time. The murder rate declined even further to 60.3 in 2019.

Economy 

A large push factor for the mass emigration was the economic situation of the country. The Venezuelan economic crisis, which is known as one of the most severe in recent economic history, was largely driven by the international oil prices dropping in 2014 and the governments inadequate response led to the exacerbation of the crisis and eventual 2017 recession, which is one of the worst recessions in the recent history of the Western hemisphere.

Many business owners have emigrated to countries with growing economies since the Bolivarian Revolution. The economic crisis experienced in Venezuela is worse than the events following the dissolution of the Soviet Union. Since Hugo Chávez imposed stringent currency controls in 2003 in an attempt to prevent capital flight, a series of currency devaluations has disrupted the Venezuelan economy. Price controls and other government policies have caused severe shortages in Venezuela. As a result of the shortages, Venezuelans must search for food (occasionally eating wild fruit or garbage), wait in line for hours, and live without some products.

According to a 2018 Gallup analysis, "[g]overnment decisions have led to a domino-effect crisis that continues to worsen, leaving residents unable to afford basic necessities such as food and housing", with Venezuelans "believ[ing] they can find better lives elsewhere".

Currently, the economy of Venezuela continues to experience stagflation, devaluation, a housing crisis, exacerbated external debt, and reductions of more than 35% reduction in GDP. According to the International Monetary Fund (IMF), the Venezuelan economy contracted by 45% between 2013 and 2018. Venezuela's inflation rate passed over 100 percent by 2015, the world's highest inflation rate and the highest in the country's history. By the end of 2018, this rate would rise to 1.35 million percent. Additionally, GDP is predicted to decrease by an additional 25% by the end of 2019.

Health and healthcare access 
The economic and political situation in Venezuela led to increasing levels of poverty and scarcity of resources including food and medicine, greatly impacting the health and well-being of Venezuelans. In 2018, it was estimated that about 90% of the population was living in conditions of poverty. With regards to nutritional health, in 2017 Venezuelans lost an average of 11 kilograms of bodyweight and 60% of the population reported that they did not have sufficient resources necessary to access food. Venezuelans remaining in country have little access to food items, in 2018 the Ministry of Food reported that 84% of items that are part of the basic food basket as are not available in supermarkets. Food production has also decreased by 60% between 2014 and 2018, the agricultural sectors has been weakened by both the Chavez and Maduro administrations, and food imports decreased by 70% between 2014 and 2016.

Additionally, the general fracturing of the state led to reduced provision of health services and a deteriorating health sector. This low resource impoverished setting was the perfect breeding ground for the rise of diseases such as measles, diphtheria, tuberculosis, and malaria. Medicine imports decreased by 70% between the years 2012 and 2016, only 15 out of 56 pharmaceutical companies still function, and over 150 pharmacies have closed since 2016. In late 2018, 85% of essential medicines were declared as being scarce, and according to the UN, 300,000 individuals are at risk because they have not had access to essential medicines for over a year. The Government has stopped publishing data on national level health indicators in 2015, but the situation is believed to be dire.

Political repression 

According to Venezuelan Community Abroad: A New Method of Exile, the Bolivarian government "would rather urge those who disagree with the revolution to leave, instead of pausing to think deeply about the damage this diaspora entails to the country".  Newsweek reported that Chávez "has pushed hard against anyone" who was not part of his movement, resulting in large swaths of science, business, and media professionals emigrating from Venezuela.

Up to 9,000 Venezuelan exiles lived in the United States in 2014, with the number of exiles also increasing in the European Union. The Florida Center for Survivors of Torture reported in 2015 that most of those they assisted since the previous year were Venezuelan migrants, with the organization providing psychiatrists, social workers, interpreters, lawyers and doctors for dozens of individuals and their families.

Effects

Education 
Many Venezuelan emigrants are educated professionals. Iván de la Vega of the Simón Bolívar University (USB) found that 60 to 80 percent of students in Venezuela said that they want to leave the country and not return to 2015 conditions. Primary and secondary school students were also affected, with media reports of children at school fainting from hunger. In Venezuela's border regions, the school dropout rate is as high as 80 percent.

According to a 2014 report that Iván de la Vega wrote, about 1 million Venezuelans had emigrated during the Chávez presidency but the number of academics was unknown; UCV lost more than 700 of its 4,000 professors between 2011 and 2015. About 240 professors left USB between 2009 and 2014, with an additional 430 faculty members leaving from 2015 to 2017.

Major reasons for the emigration of educational professionals include Venezuela's crime rate and low government pay. According to the President of the Venezuelan Academy of Physical, Mathematical and Natural Sciences, Claudio Bifano, most of Venezuela's "technology and scientific capacity, built up over half a century" had been lost during Hugo Chávez's presidency. Despite 2 percent of the country's GDP being invested in science and technology, the number of papers published in international journals fell from about 1,600 to 1,000 (the 1997 figure, when Venezuela's technology budget was 0.3 percent of GDP) from 2008 to 2012.

Mariano Herrera, the director of the Centre for Cultural Research and Education, estimated a shortage by about 40 percent of that necessary for teachers of mathematics and science in 2014. The Venezuelan government attempted to ease the teacher shortage by creating the Simón Rodríguez Micromission, reducing graduation requirements for educational professionals to two years of studies. From January to March 2018, 102 of 120 positions at USB remained vacant.

The Venezuelan Community Abroad: A New Method of Exile study reported that over 90 percent of Venezuela's more than 1.5 million emigrants were college graduates; 40 percent had a master's degree, and 12 percent had doctorates or post-doctorate degrees. The study used official data verified abroad and surveys from Venezuelans who had decided to emigrate.

Economy 
Businesspersons emigrated from Venezuela due to government price controls and corruption, shortages, and foreign exchange controls. Accountants and administrators left for countries experiencing economic growth, such as Argentina, Chile, Mexico, Peru, and the US. A Latin America Economic System study reported that the emigration of highly skilled laborers age 25 or older from Venezuela to OECD countries rose by 216 percent between 1990 and 2007.

An estimated 75 percent of about 20,000 PDVSA (Petróleos de Venezuela) workers who left the company emigrated to other countries for work. Former oil engineers began work on oil rigs in the North Sea and in the tar sands of western Canada; the number of Venezuelans in Alberta increased from 465 in 2001 to 3,860 in 2011. Former PDVSA employees also joined the more-successful oil industry in neighboring Colombia. According to El Universal, "thousands of oil engineers and technicians, adding up to hundreds of thousands of man-hours in training and expertise in the oil industry (more meaningful than academic degrees)", and most of PDVSA's former executives, are working abroad. After the PDVSA exodus, Venezuelan oil production decreased and work-related injuries increased.

By 2019, more than 50,000 engineers and architects had left Venezuela in the six preceding years, with some of the Venezuelan labor force being replaced by foreign workers, including Chinese counterparts.

Media and the arts 
Actors, producers, TV presenters, news anchors, and journalists have reportedly left for Colombia, Florida, and Spain after the closing of media outlets by the Venezuelan government, or their purchase by government sympathizers. Musicians have emigrated to places receptive to their style of music.

Healthcare 

Physicians and medical staff, particularly those in private facilities, emigrated due to low pay and lack of recognition following the Venezuelan government's opposition to traditional 6-year programs. The Bolivarian government instead supports Cuba's training of "community medical doctors". The government reportedly restricted access to facilities and funding for physician training, which led to medical programs closing across the country.

The Medical Federation of Venezuela's president, Douglas León Natera, said in April 2015 that more than 13,000 doctors (over 50 percent of the country's total) had emigrated. According to Natera, the resulting physician shortage affected public and private hospitals alike. In March 2018 (after 22,000 doctors had fled Venezuela), the salary of many physicians was less than 10 per month.

In Latin American countries, the medical credentials of Venezuelan doctors are generally accepted. Opportunities for Venezuelans are limited in the United States, however, with physicians often becoming medical assistants or working in non-medical fields.

Statistics

Migrant numbers 
According to Iván de la Vega, the number of Venezuelans living abroad increased by over 2,000 percent from the mid-1990s to 2013 (from 50,000 to 1,200,000). The median emigrant age is 32.

The percentage of Venezuelans who said that they had family abroad increased from 10 percent in 2004 to nearly 30 percent in 2014. In 2014, about 10 percent said that they were presently preparing to emigrate. According to the UN High Commissioner for Refugees, "[b]etween 2003 and 2004, the number of (Venezuelan) refugees doubled from 598 to 1,256, and between 2004 and 2009, the number of Venezuelan refugees was five-fold higher, up to 6,221. By that date, there is also a log of 1,580 Venezuelan applicants for refuge."

A late-2017 survey by Consultores 21 found that over four million Venezuelans had left the country due to the Bolivarian Revolution, and 51 percent of young adults said that they wanted to emigrate. In 2018, it was estimated that over one million Venezuelans had plans to emigrate. Emigrants primarily consist of professionals between 18 and 35.

Characteristics of migrants 
The characteristics of migrants are important to understand because these drive and affect vulnerabilities and migration patterns. According to an IOM survey of Venezuelan migrants in Brazil, Colombia, and Peru from 2018, respondents in Brazil were of average age 32, respondents in Colombia and Peru were of average age 30, males were 58% of the surveyed population, 5% of women surveyed in Colombia were pregnant, 3% in Brazil, and 1% in Peru, 31% percent of respondents Brazil and 39% of respondents in Colombia reported being without any regular migration status, and 41% of the respondents in Brazil were traveling alone, 37% in Colombia and 31% in Peru. In a 2019 vulnerability study for migrants to Central America and the Caribbean, IOM found that 4% of respondents in the study were pregnant women, 32% of females said that they were affected by discrimination and 5% of these women were pregnant, 58% of females reported lack of healthcare access and 57% of males did, and 65% of respondents travel alone vs 35% travel in a group.

Colombian population 

According to Universidad de los Andes sociologist Raquel Alvarez, 77 percent of immigrants to Venezuela during the 1990s were from Colombia. By the early 2010s, the Colombian immigrants were disappointed with Venezuela's economic collapse and discrimination by the government and its supporters. Between tens of thousands and 200,000 Colombians left Venezuela in the years before 2015. The Colombian Ministry of Foreign Affairs reported that visas to Colombia increased by 150 percent between March 2014 and March 2015, and repatriation assistance of Colombian-Venezuelans reached a record number in the first quarter of 2015. Martin Gottwald, deputy head of the United Nations refugee agency in Colombia, said that many of the 205,000 Colombian refugees who had fled to Venezuela may return to Colombia. The number of repatriating Colombians concerned the Colombian government, due to its effect on unemployment and public services.

Jewish population 

The Jewish population in Venezuela has, according to several community organizations, declined from an estimated 18,000–22,000 in the year 2000 to about 9,000 in 2010. Community leaders cite the economy, security, and increased antisemitism as major reasons for the decline. Some have accused the government of engaging in, or supporting, antisemitic action and rhetoric. In 2015, it was reported that the Jewish population had declined to 7,000.

Refugee life

Aid 
Organizations and events have been created to assist Venezuelan emigrants. The website MeQuieroIr.com (Spanish: "I want to go") was created by a former public-affairs employee of PDVSA who moved to Canada, and quickly became popular among Venezuelan emigrants. In June 2015, the first annual Migration Expo was held in Caracas; the event included support groups, study-abroad assistance, and help with the emigration process. The Somos Diáspora network, consisting of a website and radio station in Lima, Peru, was launched in May 2018 to provide Venezuelan entertainment, news and migration information to the diaspora.

Problems

Crime 
The Maduro government often granted the emigration of Venezuelan criminals and organized crime into regional countries, with nations like Aruba, Colombia, Panama, Peru and the United States experiencing higher crime as a result.

In June 2018, a group of Venezuelans robbed a jewelry store in Jockey Plaza, Peru, and fled the country. On July 27, 2018, four Venezuelans shot and injured one police officer while robbing a store in the country, though they were later captured. The "Tren de Aragua" (Train of Aragua) gang of Venezuela–which flourished in their native country's impunity where they directed robbery, kidnapping and murder operations–saw five of their members arrested in August 2018 for planning a bank robbery at a Peruvian shopping mall. The Venezuelan gang members were found by the National Police of Peru equipped with firearms, a grenade, and a map of the bank. At least seventy-two Venezuelans were imprisoned in Peru by mid-2018.

On February 19, 2019, a group of masked Venezuelan and Colombian migrants attempted to break-in at the Inkaterra Amazon Reserve lodge in the Madre de Dios region of Peru, resulting in the death of a local tour guide. A total of 53 guests, including American and Chinese tourists, were safe.

Four Venezuelans were put under preventive detention in 2021 after evidence indicated they had engaged in drug trafficking and assaulted Chilean police in Iquique. President-elect Gabriel Boric condemned the aggression against police and Interior Minister Rodrigo Delgado announced the four will be expelled from Chile whatever the result of the trial may result in.

Discrimination 
Venezuelan refugees have occasionally faced xenophobia and discrimination in destination countries. The International Organization for Migration has increased awareness that refugees are vulnerable to trafficking and prostitution. Venezuelans in Panama experience xenophobia due to competition with local residents, and Panamanian nationalist movements have used anti-Venezuelan-refugee rhetoric to gain support.

Discrimination toward Venezuelans has occasionally been a problem in Ecuador, and in a 2019 survey of Venezuelans and other migrant groups in the capitol city of Quito, about half of Venezuelans reported that they had experienced discrimination since coming to Ecuador (compared to 62% of surveyed Colombian migrants in Quito who said the same thing).

In Brazil, at least 1,200 Venezuelans were forced from refugee camps by residents of Pacaraima on August 18, 2018, after the family of a local merchant told the authorities that he had been assaulted by a group of Venezuelans. However, two days later the authorities said the assailants’ identity and nationality had not been confirmed. The residents of the city destroyed the migrant camps.

Prostitution 
Many Venezuelan women in Colombia resort to prostitution to earn a living. In "La Chama", a Panamanian hit song by Mr. Saik, the singer mocks a Venezuelan woman that resorts to prostitution; the singer received death threats from aggrieved migrants. Educated Venezuelan emigrants have also turned to prostitution because they can no longer continue the careers they pursued.

Health

Infectious diseases 
The re-emergence of measles, and other communicable diseases as a result of Venezuela's physician shortage raised concerns in destination countries that refugees would spread disease throughout the region. Measles outbreaks occurred in Brazil, Colombia, and Ecuador in areas in which Venezuelan refugees lived; most of the infected were refugees. Increases in malaria and diphtheria in Venezuela have also raised concerns in neighboring countries. As of August 2019, Venezuelan migrants will be given regional vaccination cards to make sure they receive vaccines and are not given double doses. This move was agreed by health officials from the United States, Colombia, Ecuador, Panama, Canada, Haiti, the Dominican Republic, Argentina, Peru and Paraguay.

Mental health 
Many Venezuelan refugees suffer from posttraumatic stress disorder due to the traumatic events they have experienced within their native country. Migrants experience both physical and psychological symptoms from their traumas which are caused by violence in Venezuela, leaving relatives behind, and adapting to the culture of their host countries. Some of the main causes of hospitalization among Venezuelan refugees in Peru are mental health related.

Traveling 
Venezuelans have emigrated in a number of ways, and images of migrants fleeing by sea have been compared to Cuban exiles. Many refugees travel by foot for thousands of miles due to their inability to afford other travel methods, trekking over mountain ranges, walking distances on highways towing suitcases, hitchhiking when able and fording rivers to escape the crisis. The majority begin their travels at the border town of Cucuta, Colombia and then leave to their individual destinations. Refugees are also susceptible to fake travel guides and robberies along their journey.

Those who leave by foot are known as los caminantes (the walkers); the walk to Bogotá, Colombia is 350 miles, and some walk hundreds of miles further, to Ecuador or Peru.  Alba Pereira, who helps feed and clothe about 800 walkers daily in Northern Colombia, said in 2019 she is seeing more sick, elderly and pregnant among the walkers. The Colombian Red Cross has set up rest tents with food and water on the side of the roads for Venezuelans. Venezuelans also cross into northern Brazil, where UNHCR has set up 10 shelters to house thousands of Venezuelans. Images of Venezuelans fleeing the country by sea have raised symbolic comparisons to the images seen from the Cuban diaspora.

Venezuelan migrants have entered Chile from Bolivia through the Altiplano locality of Colchane. The route walked by migrants is arid, cold and lies at 3,600 meters above sea level. This route is chose since the more direct, and less harsh route across the Chile–Peru border is better guarded. Migrants are aided in the crossing by human smugglers. By February 2021 the cost for a family to be crossed from Bolivia into Chile was between US$200 and US$500. Migrants have been accused by the alcalde of Colchane and local residents of acting violently by forcing themselves into inhabited houses of Colchane, engaging in theft and occupying public spaces.

Destinations 
The number and characteristics of people leaving Venezuela can be hard to track. General estimates have been made that capture the scale of the migration. Migration flow from Venezuela to significant destinations (which include most of Latin America, North America, and parts of Europe) has increased from 380,790 in 2005 to 1,580,022 in 2017 (IOM, 2018a), where the estimates are based on each receiving government estimation. There are many migrants who enter a receiving country with regular status, but there are many who do not. The number of those who enter irregularly is difficult to estimate because of their immigration status.

The top ten destinations (significant destinations) for Venezuelan emigrants are Colombia, Peru, the United States, Spain, Italy, Portugal, Argentina, Canada, France, and Panama. Tens of thousands of Venezuelans have also moved to other locations, including Trinidad and Tobago and other countries in the Americas and Europe.

Venezuelans have fled to over 90 countries in pursuit of a better life. Between 2015 and 2017, Venezuelan immigration increased by 1,388 percent in Chile, 1,132 percent in Colombia, 1,016 percent in Peru, 922 percent in Brazil, 344 percent in Argentina and Ecuador, 268 percent in Panama, 225 percent in Uruguay, 104 percent in Mexico, 38 percent in Costa Rica, 26 percent in Spain, and 14 percent in the United States.

United States 

The United States is one of the main destinations for Venezuelan emigrants. The number of U.S. residents who identified as Venezuelan increased by 135 percent between 2000 and 2010, from 91,507 to 215,023. In 2015, it was estimated that about 260,000 Venezuelans had emigrated to the United States. According to researcher Carlos Subero, "[t]he vast majority of Venezuelans trying to migrate enter the country with a non-immigrant tourist or business visa", statistics showing that 527,907 Venezuelans remain in the United States with non-immigrant visas. The Latin American and Caribbean Economic System (SELA) reported that in 2007, 14 percent of Venezuelans 25 and older in the United States had a doctoral degree; above the U.S. average of nine percent.

Before October 2022, Venezuelans seeking asylum could enter the United States through land borders, and could reside in the United States while their cases are being assessed. However, around October 12,  2022, the United States announced Venezuelans entering "between ports of entry, without authorization, will be returned to Mexico". The United States also announced that Venezuelans entering lawfully would be eligible for a new humanitarian program, if they have a sponsor in the United States, with the new program capped at up to 24,000 Venezuelans.

The largest community of Venezuelans in the United States lives in South Florida. Between the years 2000 and 2012, the number of legal Venezuelan residents in Florida increased from 91,500 to 259,000.

Latin America and the Caribbean 
Latin American countries, such as Argentina, Brazil, Chile, Colombia, Ecuador, Mexico, Peru and Panama, are popular destinations for Venezuelan emigrants.

Argentina 

Venezuelan immigration has increased significantly since 2005, from 148 people annually to 12,859 in 2016. Over 15,000 Venezuelans emigrated to Argentina from 2004 to 2014, of whom 4,781 have obtained permanent residency. The number of Venezuelan immigrants increased by 500 percent from 2014 to 2016, to 600 per week. Between 2014 and mid-2017, 38,540 Venezuelans filed residency applications in Argentina.

Venezuelans emigrating to Argentina face several obstacles, such as the cost of plane fare, due to the distance between the countries compared to that of the neighboring Colombia and Brazil. Attracted by better living conditions, many risk the trip by land; Marjorie Campos, a Venezuelan woman who was eight months pregnant, traveled by bus for 11 days across Colombia, Ecuador, Peru and Chile to reach the Argentine city of Cordoba.

Brazil 

As socioeconomic conditions worsened, many Venezuelans emigrated to neighboring Brazil. Tens of thousands of refugees traveled through the Amazon basin seeking a better life, some traveling by foot and paying over $1,000 to be smuggled into larger cities. The Brazilian government increased its military presence on the border to assist refugees on its roads and rivers. Over 70,000 refugees entered the border state of Roraima in northern Brazil in late 2016, straining local resources. Hundreds of children from Venezuela are enrolled in schools near the Brazil-Venezuela border, and about 800 Venezuelans entered Brazil daily by 2018.

On August 7, 2018, the regional government requested that the Supreme Federal Court of Brazil close the border, and later that day the Supreme Federal Court denied the request on constitutional grounds.

The Brazilian Army launched in February 2018 Operação Acolhida, that aims to protect Venezuelans crossing the border, providing humanitarian aid to immigrants in vulnerable situations.

Colombia 
Colombia, a country that borders Venezuela and has a long history with the country, has received the largest number of Venezuelan migrants. Following the reopening of the Colombian border after the Venezuela–Colombia migrant crisis, many Venezuelans began to emigrate into the country. Since then, Colombia has accepted many Venezuelan refugees and has attempted to give legal status to them. The aid provided by the Colombian government to Venezuelan refugees has been costly, and multiple international partners have intervened to provide assistance. Assistance provided by Colombia to Venezuelans ranges from emergency room visits to public education for children; all provided by the Colombian government for free. In August 2019, President Ivan Duque announced that Colombia would grant citizenship to 24,000 children born in Colombia to migrant Venezuelan parents, in order to prevent them from being stateless.

In July 2016, over 200,000 Venezuelans entered Colombia to purchase goods due to shortages in Venezuela. On August 12, 2016, the Venezuelan government officially reopened the border; thousands of Venezuelans again entered Colombia to escape the Venezuelan crisis. Colombia's oil industry has benefited from skilled Venezuelan immigrants, although the country began deporting unauthorized immigrants in late 2016.

According to the Colombian government, more than 100,000 Venezuelans emigrated to Colombia in the first half of 2017. In the run-up to the 2017 Venezuelan Constituent Assembly elections, Colombia granted a Special Permit of Permanent Residence to Venezuelan citizens who entered the country before July 25; over 22,000 Venezuelans applied for permanent residence in the permit's first 24 hours of receiving applications. By the end of November 2017, over 660,000 Venezuelans were in Colombia, twice as many as there had been in June. At the end of 2018, there were more than 1.2 million Venezuelans in Colombia. Between April and June of the 2018, Colombia registered more than 442,000 Venezuelans who were irregularly in the country through a registration process called RAMV. Beginning in January 2020, the Colombian government announced it would offer work permits to hundreds of thousands of Venezuelans living in Colombia, allowing them to integrate into the formal economy. The influx of refugees has caused an increase in xenophobia by some Colombians, who blame the refugees for rising crime, unemployment and the spread of COVID-19. In December 2020, President Duque announced that undocumented Venezuelan migrants would not receive vaccinations for the coronavirus despite concerns from refugee agencies.

In February 2021, the government of Colombia announced the legalization of undocumented Venezuelan migrants in the country, making them eligible to receive 10-year residency permits.

Costa Rica
The number of Venezuelan asylum seekers in the country increased from only 200 in 2015 to 1,423 in 2016, going up to 2,600 in 2017; this has been a subject that discussed jointly by the governments of both Costa Rica and Panama in a bilateral summit. Of the total of 6,337 refugee applications in the country in 2017, 50% were from Venezuelans.

Chile 

Between 2015 and 2017, Venezuelan emigration to Chile increased by 1,388 percent. In 2016, Venezuelans emigrated to Chile due to its stable economy and simple immigration policy. According to the Chilean Department for Foreigners and Migration, the number of Chilean visas for Venezuelans increased from 758 in 2011 to 8,381 in 2016; 90 percent were work visas for Venezuelans aged 20 to 35. Since international travel by air is difficult (especially due to the value of the Venezuelan bolívar), many Venezuelans must travel overland through dangerous terrain to reach Chile. After arriving, they must start a new life. According to Catholic Chilean Migration Institute executive secretary Delio Cubides, most Venezuelan immigrants "are accountants, engineers, teachers, the majority of them very well-educated" but accept low-paying jobs so they can meet visa requirements and remain in the country.

An 2021 report by Chile's National Institute of Statistics estimates that by December 2020 about 448.800 Venezuelans live in the country, or 30.7 percent of Chile's immigrant population. This constitutes a raise of 34 percent in comparison to 2018, when 288.940 Venezuelans lived in Chile.

Ecuador 
Ecuador was the third-largest recipient of Venezuelan migrants in the hemisphere as of 2021, after Colombia and Peru. While Ecuador has had a history of progressive and relatively welcoming policies toward migrants, the response toward the newer Venezuelan population has been more mixed, and then-president Lenin Moreno imposed visa and other documentation requirements on entering Venezuelans that were difficult to meet.  Venezuelans in Ecuador have been relatively well-organized, forming humanitarian associations and engaging with the media to shape popular perceptions of this population among Ecuadorians. Then President-elect of Ecuador, Guillermo Lasso, anticipated that he will seek to regularize the situation of over 400,000 Venezuelan residents in the country once he takes office.

Mexico 

The Venezuelan population in Mexico increased from 2,823 in 2000 to 10,063 in 2010, a 357 percent increase in Venezuelan-born people living in Mexico. Mexico granted 975 Venezuelans permanent identification cards in the first five months of 2014, double the number of ID cards issued in 2013. The Mexican government claims that 47,000 Venezuelans currently reside in Mexico.

Dutch Caribbean islands 
Once a tourist and vacation destination for Venezuelans, the islands of Aruba and Curaçao require Venezuelan citizens to have at least $1,000 USD in cash prior to immigrating, which is over five years' income for a Venezuelan working a minimum-wage job. Patrols and deportation of Venezuelans have increased, and Aruba has dedicated a stadium to hold up to 500 Venezuelan migrants facing deportation.

The journey to Curaçao is an often-dangerous  trip that includes dangerous waters monitored by the Dutch Caribbean Coast Guard as well as armed gangs. Venezuelans are brought near the island's shore, dumped overboard and forced to swim to land, where they meet contacts to set up their new lives. Curaçao authorities state that common jobs held by Venezuelans on the islands are to serve tourists, with their work ranging from cleaning restaurants to being active in the islands' sex trade. The Dutch Caribbean Coast Guard estimates that only five to ten percent of boats carrying Venezuelan migrants are intercepted.

In 2019, recently arrived Venezuelan refugees were estimated to number around 17,000 on Aruba, accounting for some 15% of the island's population.

On 21 August 2020, according to Human Rights Watch, Venezuelan migrants detained in Aruban detention centers were reported of facing dangerous COVID-19 risks. Several media outlets and human rights organizations have reported poor conditions, including overcrowding of cells, violence from the guards, and lack of basic hygiene products for Venezuelan migrants in detention.

Peru 

Compared to other destination countries, The New York Times described Peru as being more welcoming to Venezuelan refugees.

Peruvian President Pedro Pablo Kuczynski introduced legislation in 2017 granting existing Venezuelan nationals in Peru a Temporary Permit of Permanence (PTP). The Inter-American Commission on Human Rights approved, encouraging other Latin American countries to adopt similar measures. The Venezuelan Union in Peru, a non-governmental organization, announced that they would present President Kuczynski's actions to the Norwegian Nobel Committee and nominate him for the Nobel Peace Prize:

In August 2017, a little over three months after the decree, over 40,000 Venezuelan refugees had entered Peru. By mid-2018, over 400,000 Venezuelans had emigrated to Peru. In a United Nations survey, 61.9 percent of Venezuelans who moved to Peru worked in retail, tourism or a similar position; 9.4 percent worked in industry and construction. Forty-six percent earned between 984 and 1,968 soles ($300–600) per month; 34 percent earned between 656 and 984 soles ($200–300), and 11 percent earned less than 656 soles per month (less than $200). By the end of 2018 more than 670,000 Venezuelans had emigrated to Peru.

In June 2019, Peruvian president Martín Vizcarra announced that Peru would only accept Venezuelans with passports and visas following June 15, 2019. In the week before the deadline, about 50,000 Venezuelans scrambled to enter Peru while they had the opportunity. In August 2019, the government announced that it will take stricter measures to boost up security at its border with Ecuador to prevent illegal immigration after previous measures showed 90% drop in legal crossings.

Trinidad and Tobago 
It is estimated that there are over 40,000 Venezuelan citizens residing in Trinidad and Tobago, whilst 16,523 have officially regularised their immigration status. Venezuelans have historically emigrated, both legally and illegally, to Trinidad and Tobago due to the country's relatively-stable economy, access to United States dollars, and close proximity to eastern Venezuela. There are legal transport routes both by air and sea: direct flights to the islands leave from the Venezuelan cities of Maturin, Caracas and Isla Margarita, and there is ferry service from the Venezuelan town Guiria and the city of Chaguaramas on Trinidad, or from the Venezuelan town of Tucupita to Trinidad's Cedros. Illegal routes also exist between Venezuela's east coast and the Gulf of Paria. About 14,000 Venezuelans entered Trinidad and Tobago between January 1 and May 10, 2016, with 43 percent reportedly overstaying their visas. Venezuelans who remain often seek employment on the island.

After being rejected and returned to the open sea on 13 December 2020, Venezuelan rafters fleeing the economic crisis shipwrecked in the maritime border when they were returning from Trinidad and Tobago to Sucre state, Venezuela. At least 32 Venezuelans of the 33 that drowned were identified, four of which were minors. Juan Guaidó declared three days of national mourning. In April 2021, another boat with 29 people shipwrecked during a trip to Trinidad and Tobago; 12 people were rescued, 10 died and 7 were declared missing. On 5 February 2022, the Trinidad and Tobago coast guard fired upon a vessel with Venezuelan migrants while attempting to stop it, killing a nine-month-old baby and injuring his mother. The coast guard claimed that the shots were fired "in self-defense". Guaidó stated that "the shots fired by the Trinidad and Tobago Coast Guard have no justification, they killed him", demanding justice. The Prime Minister of Trinidad and Tobago, Keith Rowley, deemed the action "legal and appropriate".

Europe
In February 2018, almost 1,400 Venezuelans flew across the Atlantic Ocean into Europe. Most of these (1,160) sought asylum in Spain. The number was a significant increase from 150 in February 2016, and 985 in February 2017. Cultural and linguistic ties are the main reason why Spain is the most popular destination among European countries for Venezuelan migrants. Venezuelan citizens can travel the Schengen Area countries without a visa.

Spain
The vast majority of Venezuelan-born people residing in Europe live in Spain and/or have acquired Spanish citizenship, either in Venezuela or in Spain. Between 2015 and 2018 the number of Venezuelan-born residents in Spain increased from 165,893 to 255,071 people. As of 2019, the number of Venezuelans in Spain exceeds 300,000 people, implying a mass arrival in the 2018–2019 period.

Hungary 
Despite its anti-immigration rhetoric following the European migrant crisis, the government of Viktor Orbán has welcomed hundreds of Venezuelan migrants who have proven to have at least one Hungarian ancestor. However, the reception has not been as positive, with several citizens complaining to the police about the presence of black Venezuelans in the surroundings of the spa of Balatonoszod, where immigrants were initially housed.

Israel
Due to allegations of antisemitism against the government of Venezuela, based in part on its political alignment with foreign actors like Iran, Palestine and Syria, and compounded by the ongoing economic crisis, much of Venezuela's Jewish community has taken advantage of Israel's Law of Return to emigrate to Israel and take up residence there. As much as 60% of Venezuela's Jewish population has sought refuge in Israel since Chávez took office in 1999, when there were 22,000 Jews in Venezuela. This number has been dwindling to around 6,000 Jews still left in Venezuela as of 2019. Over 11,000 Venezuelans have emigrated to Israel since the start of the crisis.

Humanitarian response

International

Intergovernmental organizations 
  – In April 2018, the European Union sent observers to Colombia to assist with planning and accommodating Venezuelan refugees.
 – In March 2018, the United Nations Refugee Agency urged regional countries to treat Venezuelan migrants as refugees under the Cartagena Declaration on Refugees, and urged countries to accept Venezuelan nationals, grant them access to basic human rights, and not deport Venezuelans who enter their territories. On 6 April 2018, the United Nations World Food Programme declared the situation of Venezuelan immigrants in Colombia a Level 2 Emergency and called for a regional response to the crisis. In October 2018, following the visit of United Nations High Commissioner for Refugees Filippo Grandi to the border area of Colombia and Venezuela, Grandi stated that the refugee crisis was "monumental". On 6 May 2020, UN experts urged Venezuelan government to take some concrete steps towards the devastating impact on basic Human rights of the country's economic crisis. Experts also addressed the country's collapsing health system, pointing out that many hospitals are struggling to care for patients with no reliable electricity or even running water.
The International Donors’ Conference in Solidarity with Venezuelan Refugees and Migrants reunited 46 countries, the World Bank or the Inter-American Development Bank by visio conference on June 17, 2021. They pledged to provide 1.5 billion US dollars, consisting of $954 million in grants and $600 million in loans to help Venezuelan migrants. The government of Venezuela called it a "media farce" and "a crude anti-Venezuelan political propaganda operation". In 2020, the conference gathered 2.79 billion US dollars.

Governments 
 - On 13 December 2019, the interim government of Jeanine Áñez announced that they will give refuge to 200 Venezuelans "who have fled their country for reasons of political order, of political persecution promoted by the Nicolás Maduro government." 
 – The Colombian government called for aid from the United Nations and regional partners for the influx of hundreds of thousands of Venezuelan immigrants.
 – Foreign Minister Epsy Campbell reported that the country will maintain its “humanitarian attitude of reception” to Venezuelans, understanding that the political situation in that country is “complex”.
 – On 9 April 2018, the government of Norway allocated $1 million to fund humanitarian aid in Colombia for Venezuelan refugees.
 – USAID began funding Venezuelan care for refugees in Colombia in March 2018, allocating $2.5 million for humanitarian aid. On 13 April, Vice President Mike Pence announced during the 8th Summit of the Americas that the Department of State and USAID would provide $16 million to the United Nations High Commissioner for Refugees for aid to Venezuelan refugees in Brazil and Colombia. On 17 August 2018, United States Secretary of Defense Jim Mattis stated that the USNS Comfort hospital ship had set sail to Colombia to provide medical care for Venezuelan refugees during Operation Enduring Promise. In September 2019, the State Department stated that the United States will give $120 million in humanitarian assistance to help Latin American countries cope with the influx of Venezuelan migrants.

The Venezuelan migrant crisis is unique in the world of humanitarian crisis and because of this, has been slow in receiving international attention and aid. The crisis is not an easily defined refugee crisis, and the UN has defined the flow of emigrants as a mixed flow population. This means that those leaving the country are both general migrants and specifically defined asylum-seekers. For this reason, the UN has created a joint platform between UNHCR and IOM, called the Regional Inter-Agency Coordination Platform, tasked with assisting those emigrating from Venezuela. UNHCR has issued a call to apply the wider definition of refugee outlined in the Cartagena Declaration of 1984 to Venezuelan migrants. This would allow this group of individuals to be aided as refugees.

In April 2019, non-governmental organizations Human Rights Watch and the Johns Hopkins Bloomberg School of Public Health to publish a report and asked the United Nations (UN) to define the situation in Venezuela as a complex humanitarian emergency.

The Brookings Institution and David Smolansky, Organization of American States commissioner for the Venezuelan refugee crisis, have estimated that the crisis is the current most underfunded refugee crisis in modern history.

Visa restrictions 
As of January 2021, governments of 10 countries (mostly in Latin America and Caribbean) have introduced special visa requirements for Venezuelan citizens seeking to enter these countries. According to the UN High Commissioner for Human Rights Michelle Bachelet, the introduction of visa requirements could cause Venezuelans in resorting to people-smugglers and human traffickers for illegal entry. Some countries such as Guatemala, Caribbean Netherlands and the Dominican Republic, will still allow Venezuelans to enter visa-free if holding a valid visa/residence permit from a particular third country, such as Canada or the United States.

By 2021, the European Union will introduce an electronic authorization system for Venezuelans planning to visit the Schengen Zone, called ETIAS or European Travel Information and Authorization System.  This means that Venezuelans wanting to visit the Schengen Area countries will require to submit personal data in advance and pay a processing fee, except for children. In March 2020, the Spanish government ruled out on imposing visa requirements on Venezuelans seeking to enter Spain or the Schengen Area.

Catholic Church 
The Catholic Church in Peru organized programs to help Venezuelan refugees, dedicating masses and collections to the migrants.

Quito Declaration 
The Quito Declaration on Human Mobility and Venezuelan Citizens in the Region was signed in the Ecuadorian capital on September 4, 2018, by the representatives of Argentina, Brazil, Chile, Colombia, Costa Rica, Ecuador, Mexico, Panama, Paraguay, Peru and Uruguay. Bolivia and the Dominican Republic did not sign the document. The last nation argued that it was an observer country in the meeting that Venezuela decided not to attend.

The event sought to exchange information and achieve a coordinated response to the massive migratory flow of Venezuelans. At the meeting, the countries reiterated their concern about the deterioration of the internal situation caused by mass migration, so they call to accept the opening of humanitarian assistance in which the cooperation of governments and international organizations is agreed to decompress what they consider a critical situation.

Among the most important points agreed by the governments of the region are the acceptance of expired travel documents, identity card of the Venezuelans for migratory purposes and the exhortation to the government of Nicolás Maduro to take urgently and as a priority the necessary measures for the timely provision of identity cards, passports, birth certificates, marriage certificates and criminal records, as well as apostille and legalization.

Domestic 
President Nicolás Maduro said that international reports of millions of Venezuelans emigrating are "propaganda", and Venezuelans regret leaving the country because they end up "cleaning toilets in Miami". Angry Venezuelans criticized Maduro, saying that they would rather clean toilets in another country than live in Venezuela. In September 2018, President Maduro said that his countrymen had been victims of a hate campaign, and that in Peru they had only found racism, contempt, economic persecution and slavery.

Venezuelan Vice President Delcy Rodríguez denied her country has a humanitarian and migration crisis, calling it "fake news". She argued that the humanitarian crisis would be "an excuse for the United States to invade Venezuela and deepen the economic war."

President of the National Constituent Assembly and Vice President of the United Socialist Party of Venezuela, Diosdado Cabello, claimed that the migrant crisis is being staged as part of a right-wing conspiracy to overthrow the government of Nicolás Maduro, and that images showing Venezuelans fleeing across South America on foot had been manufactured.

Back to the homeland plan 
In 2018, the Bolivarian government introduced the "Back to the homeland plan" (Spanish: Plan Vuelta a la Patria) that offers the payment of tickets to Venezuelan migrants who want to return to their country. On August 28, 2018, 89 Venezuelans returned to Venezuela from Peru. The program was implemented in Peru and other in other South American countries such as Ecuador and Chile. However, the program has achieved very little for the return of their fellow citizens.

See also 

Crisis in Venezuela (2012–present)
Venezuelan protests (2014–present)
Quito Process
Ukrainian refugee crisis
Vietnamese boat people
North Korean defectors
Refugees of the Syrian Civil War
European migrant crisis
List of diasporas
Visa requirements for Venezuelan citizens
List of incidents of xenophobia during the Venezuelan refugee crisis
Emigration from Colombia (during the Colombian conflict)
Refugees on Jeju Island

References

External links

Groups 
Somos Diáspora – Network with Venezuelan entertainment, news and migration information

Articles 

 
Crisis in Venezuela
Venezuelan diaspora
Refugees in South America
Migrant crises
Social history of Venezuela
Human rights in Venezuela